Il Signor Max is a 1937 Italian "white-telephones" comedy film directed by Mario Camerini and starring Vittorio De Sica and Assia Noris.

Plot
Gianni is a poor, young newspaper salesman in Rome. However, during his vacations he poses as Count Max Varaldo, an aristocrat. Once, on a cruise in Naples, he meets Donna Paola, a wealthy snob, and her maid Lauretta (a common, shy girl). After trying to establish a relationship with Donna Paola, Gianni, disappointed, decides to drop his alter ego Max and propose to Lauretta. However, she now believes that he is a Count. A series of humorous misunderstandings will happen before things get cleared.

Cast
Vittorio De Sica as Gianni/Max Varaldo 
Assia Noris as Lauretta 
Rubi Dalma as Donna Paola 
Umberto Melnati as Riccardo 
Lilia Dale as Pucci (billed as Adonella) 
Virgilio Riento as Pepe 
Mario Casaleggio as Uncle Pietro 
Caterina Collo as Aunt Lucia 
Ernesto Ghigi  as Pierino 
Romolo Costa as Commandante Baldi 
Lilia Silvi as the orchard seller
Giuseppe Pierozzi as a taxi driver
Albino Principe as Bubi Bonci 
Clara Padoa as Jeanne, the athlete on the train
Luciano Dorcoratto as the guide 
Desiderio Nobile as the major 
Armando Petroni as the pharmacist  
Edda Soligo as a girl at the ball 
Gianfranco Zanchi as the real Max Varaldo

References

Bibliography

External links
 

1937 films
1937 comedy films
1930s Italian-language films
Italian black-and-white films
Films set in Italy
Films set in Rome
Films directed by Mario Camerini
Italian comedy films
Films scored by Renzo Rossellini
1930s Italian films